"Si Tú Me Amaras" (English: If You Loved Me) is a Latin ballad written by Rudy Pérez and first performed by Chilean singer Luis Jara in 1996. A year later, Mexican singer-songwriter Cristian Castro covered the song, with Perez's involvement with the production and arrangement. It was released by BMG U.S. Latin on October 20, 1997 as the third single from his fifth studio album, Lo Mejor de Mí (1997).

Promotion
A fairy tale-inspired music video, directed by Dudu Scuderi was shot in Villa Vizcaya at Miami, Florida. The video was nominated for Video of the Year at the Lo Nuestro Awards. The song was also remixed by Hex Hector which was included in Castro's album Remixes (2000). The song, along with his music video, were featured in his compilation album Nunca Voy a Olvidarte...Los Exitos (2005).

Chart performance

References

1997 singles
1997 songs
1996 songs
Cristian Castro songs
Spanish-language songs
Songs written by Rudy Pérez
Song recordings produced by Rudy Pérez
Sony BMG singles
1990s ballads
Pop ballads